Ron Aldridge (born 8 July 1933) is a Canadian field hockey player. He competed in the men's tournament at the 1964 Summer Olympics.

References

External links
 

1933 births
Living people
Canadian male field hockey players
Olympic field hockey players of Canada
Field hockey players at the 1964 Summer Olympics